Robert Andrés Mejía Navarrete (born 6 October 2000) is a Colombian footballer who plays as a midfielder for Turkish club Giresunspor on loan from Once Caldas.

Career statistics

Club

Notes

References

2000 births
Sportspeople from Cauca Department
21st-century Colombian people
Living people
Colombian footballers
Colombia youth international footballers
Association football midfielders
Deportes Quindío footballers
Boca Juniors de Cali footballers
Universitario Popayán footballers
Once Caldas footballers
Giresunspor footballers
Categoría Primera B players
Categoría Primera A players
Süper Lig players
Colombian expatriate footballers
Expatriate footballers in Turkey
Colombian expatriate sportspeople in Turkey